Zheng Yonghui (1918 – 9 September 2012) was a Chinese writer (of Chinese Vietnamese ethnicity) and translator who won the Lu Xun Literary Prize, a prestigious literature award in China.

Zheng rendered a great number of French literary works into Chinese for almost five decades, including 40 novels.

Zheng is most notable for being one of the main translators into Chinese of the works of the French novelists Honoré de Balzac, Alexandre Dumas and Victor Hugo.

Biography
Zheng was born in Haiphong, French Indo-China in 1918, with his ancestral home in Zhongshan, Guangdong.

Zheng graduated from Aurora University in 1942, majoring in law at the Department of Law, and taught there when graduated.

Zheng started to publish works in 1983 and joined the China Writers Association in 1980.

In 1987, Zheng was sent abroad to study at the expense of the government.

Zheng died in Beijing in 2012.

Works
 The Complete Works of Balzac
 La Peau de chagrin (Honoré de Balzac)
 (Balzac)
  (Alexandre Dumas)
 Our Love (Alexandre Dumas)
 (André Gide)
 The Short Stories of Prosper Merimee (Prosper Merimee)
 (George Sand)
 Nana (Emile Zola)
 Ninety-Three (Victor Hugo)
  (Victor Hugo)

Awards
 Lu Xun Literary Prize (1998)
 Chinese Translation Association – Competent Translator (2004)

Personal life
Zheng married Deng Huiqun, the couple had a son, Zheng Ruolin, who was a Chinese journalist in France.

References

1918 births
2012 deaths
People from Zhongshan
Aurora University alumni
People's Republic of China translators
French–Chinese translators
20th-century Chinese translators
21st-century Chinese translators
Vietnamese emigrants to China